Panna Lal Shakya  is an Indian politician and member of the Bharatiya Janata Party. Shakya is a former member of the Madhya Pradesh Legislative Assembly from the Guna constituency in Guna district.

Shakya gained controversy on 25 March 2018 after he suggested that girls should avoid having boyfriends in order to prevent assault.

References 

People from Guna, India
Bharatiya Janata Party politicians from Madhya Pradesh
Madhya Pradesh MLAs 2013–2018
Living people
21st-century Indian politicians
Year of birth missing (living people)